Anésio Argenton (14 March 1931 – 3 October 2011) was a Brazilian cyclist. He competed at the 1956 Summer Olympics and the 1960 Summer Olympics.

References

External links
 

1931 births
2011 deaths
Brazilian male cyclists
Brazilian road racing cyclists
Olympic cyclists of Brazil
Cyclists at the 1956 Summer Olympics
Cyclists at the 1960 Summer Olympics
Sportspeople from São Paulo (state)
Pan American Games medalists in cycling
Pan American Games gold medalists for Brazil
Pan American Games bronze medalists for Brazil
Competitors at the 1959 Pan American Games
Cyclists at the 1963 Pan American Games
Medalists at the 1959 Pan American Games
Medalists at the 1963 Pan American Games
20th-century Brazilian people
21st-century Brazilian people